Cosmic Sex is a 2013 art-house Independent Bengali Film written and directed by Amitabh Chakraborty and produced by Putul Mahmood. The film deals with the connection between Sex and Spirituality. This film won National Award and 1 crore rupees in Cannes Film Festival.

The film deals with Dehotatva (worshipping through one's own body) and explores the connection between Sex and Spirituality. The film stars Rii Sen who won the best actress award at Osian's Cinefan Festival of Asian and Arab Cinema for her bold act in the movie.

Plot 
Cosmic Sex is the story of a young man Kripa who is on the run from sex and violence one night in Kolkata when he meets a woman Sadhavi who strangely resembles his dead mother. She gives him shelter and teaches him to travel inwards through sex.

Cast 
 Rii Sen
 Ayushman Mitra
 Murari Mukherjee
 Rwik
 Papia Ghoshal

Cine Central Film Festival Kolkata
Closing film

References

External links 
 

Indian erotic films
Films set in India
Films about spirituality
Indian independent films
2013 films
Bengali-language Indian films
2010s Bengali-language films